The 2019–20 Western Sydney Wanderers FC season was the club's eighth season since its foundation in 2012. The club participated in the A-League for the eighth time, and the FFA Cup for the sixth time.

On 24 March 2020, the FFA announced that the 2019–20 A-League season would be postponed until further notice due to the COVID-19 pandemic in Australia and New Zealand, and subsequently extended indefinitely. The season resumed on 17 July 2020.

Players

Squad information

Transfers

From youth squad

Transfers in

Transfers out

Contract extensions

Manager changes

Squad statistics

Appearances and goals

Source:

Pre-season and friendlies

Competitions

Overview
{|class="wikitable" style="text-align:left"
|-
!rowspan=2 style="width:140px;"|Competition
!colspan=8|Record
|-
!style="width:30px;"|
!style="width:30px;"|
!style="width:30px;"|
!style="width:30px;"|
!style="width:30px;"|
!style="width:30px;"|
!style="width:30px;"|
!style="width:50px;"|
|-
|A-League

|-
|FFA Cup

|-
|-
!Total

FFA Cup

A-League

League table

Results summary

Result by round

Matches

References

Western Sydney Wanderers FC seasons
2019–20 A-League season by team